In the Canadian cabinet, the president of the King's Privy Council for Canada is nominally in charge of the Privy Council Office. The president of the Privy Council also has the largely ceremonial duty of presiding over meetings of the Privy Council, a body which only convenes in full for affairs of state such as the accession of a new Sovereign or the marriage of the Prince of Wales or heir presumptive to the Throne. Accordingly, the last time the president of the Privy Council had to preside over a meeting of the Privy Council was in 2022 for the proclamation of the accession of King Charles III. It is the equivalent of the office of lord president of the council in the United Kingdom.

Under Prime Ministers Pierre Trudeau and Joe Clark the position was synonymous with that of government house leader. In 1989 the government house leader became a separate position and the president of the Privy Council became a largely honorary title (not unlike that of deputy prime minister of Canada) given to a senior minister in addition to other portfolios. From 1993 it has regularly been held by whoever holds the portfolio of minister of intergovernmental affairs. In the past decade the position has generally been seen to be the closest thing to a sinecure posting within the Cabinet.

The current president of the Privy Council is Bill Blair.

List of presidents of the Privy Council

References

External links
 Privy Council Office

Canadian ministers